Valentin Sanon (born 20 May 1980) is a former Ivorian professional tennis player, who played mainly on the ITF Futures tournaments. 

The last tournament he played in was in 2011, but he has continued to play Davis Cup for the Ivory Coast, most recently in the 2012 Davis Cup's Africa zonal play.

Career titles

Singles

References
 http://www.atpworldtour.com/Tennis/Players/Sa/V/Valentin-Sanon.aspx

External links
 
 

Ivorian male tennis players
1980 births
Living people